The 2018 Duke Blue Devils football team represented Duke University in the 2018 NCAA Division I FBS football season as a member of the Atlantic Coast Conference (ACC) in the Coastal Division. The team was led by head coach David Cutcliffe, in his 11th year, and play ed its home games at Wallace Wade Stadium in Durham, North Carolina. The Blue Devils finished the regular season with an 8–5 overall record. They went 3–5 in ACC play to finish in sixth place in the Coastal Division. They were invited to the Independence Bowl, where they defeated Temple.

Previous season
The Blue Devils finished the 2017 season 7–6, 3–5 in ACC play to finish in a three-way tie for fourth place in the Coastal Division. They were invited to the Quick Lane Bowl where they defeated Northern Illinois.

Recruiting

Position key

Recruits

The Blue Devils signed a total of 16 recruits.

Preseason

Award watch lists
Listed in the order that they were released

ACC media poll
The ACC media poll was released on July 24, 2018.

Schedule

Roster

Game summaries

Army

at Northwestern

at Baylor

North Carolina Central

Virginia Tech

at Georgia Tech

Virginia

at Pittsburgh

at Miami (FL)

North Carolina

at Clemson

Wake Forest

vs. Temple (Independence Bowl)

Rankings

2019 NFL Draft

References

Duke
Duke Blue Devils football seasons
Duke Blue Devils football